Scott Clayton (born 13 November 1959) is a former Australian rules footballer who played for Fitzroy in the Victorian Football League (VFL) during the 1980s.

A tagger from Hobart, Clayton started his career with Fitzroy in 1981 and often played on key opposition players. He won Fitzroy's best and fairest award in 1990, his last season in the VFL.

Scott went on to become a recruitment manager for a number of AFL clubs, including the Brisbane Bears, Brisbane Lions, Western Bulldogs and the Gold Coast Suns.

References

External links

1959 births
Living people
Australian rules footballers from Tasmania
Fitzroy Football Club players
Mitchell Medal winners
Hobart Football Club players
Tasmanian Football Hall of Fame inductees
Tasmanian State of Origin players